Tobias Buck-Gramcko (born 1 January 2001) is a German road and track cyclist. He competed in the team pursuit and the individual pursuit at the 2021 UCI Track Cycling World Championships.

Major results

Track

2018
 3rd  Team pursuit, UEC European Junior Championships
2019
 UCI World Junior Championships
1st  Individual pursuit
1st  Kilo
1st  Team pursuit
 National Junior Championships
1st  Individual pursuit
1st  Kilo
 UEC European Junior Championships
2nd  Individual pursuit
3rd  Team pursuit
2020
 3rd  Team pursuit, UEC European Under-23 Championships
2021
 1st  Individual pursuit, UEC European Under-23 Championships
2022
 1st  Team pursuit, National Championships
 2nd  Individual pursuit, UEC European Under-23 Championships
 UCI Nations Cup
2nd Individual pursuit, Milton
3rd Team pursuit, Milton
2023
 3rd  Individual pursuit,  UEC European Championships

Road
2020
 3rd Time trial, National Under-23 Championships
2021
 5th Time trial, National Under-23 Championships
2022
 1st  Mixed team time trial, UEC European Under-23 Championships
 2nd Time trial, National Under-23 Championships

References

External links

2001 births
Living people
German male cyclists
German track cyclists
Sportspeople from Göttingen
Cyclists from Lower Saxony
21st-century German people